Potgietersrus Rugby Stadium is a rugby union stadium in Johannesburg, South Africa. It seats 4,000 people. Previously it was used as home venue by the Katlehong City Football Club, but when the club was relegated from the National First Division in May 2002, they moved their home venue to another place in the Free State Province. Since then, the stadium has mostly been used to host various Rugby games in Johannesburg.

Soccer venues in South Africa
Rugby union stadiums in South Africa
Sports venues in Johannesburg